"Sing a Simple Song" is a 1968 song by the soul/funk band Sly and the Family Stone, the B-side to their #1 hit "Everyday People". The song's lyrics, sung in turn by Sly Stone, Freddie Stone, Rose Stone, and Larry Graham, with spoken word (or, rather, shouted word) sections by Cynthia Robinson, offer a simple solution for dealing with the problems and paradoxes of existence: "Sing a simple song!" As with nearly all of Sly and the Family Stone's songs, Sylvester "Sly Stone" Stewart was credited as the sole songwriter.

The song is one of Sly and the Family Stone's signature songs, and has been covered by a number of acts, including Dusty Springfield, Diana Ross & the Supremes, The Temptations, The Jackson 5, The Commodores, Miles Davis, The Meters, Booker T. & the M.G.'s, Prince, The Budos Band, Maceo Parker and others.

It has also been sampled by numerous artists, including Ike & Tina Turner, 2Pac, Jodeci, Wu-Tang Clan, Public Enemy, De La Soul, Digital Underground ("Humpty Dance"), Cypress Hill, Gorillaz, Arrested Development, Backstreet Boys, Spice Girls, Alanis Morissette, and Adina Howard. Jimi Hendrix plays the main riff of the song on the album Band of Gypsys while he is moving to LP's last song, "We Gotta Live Together". The song's "Yah-yah-yah" refrain was referenced in The Illusion's 1969 hit "Did You See Her Eyes".

The song's title was mentioned in Sly and the Family Stone's hit song "Thank You (Falettinme Be Mice Elf Again)” (1969).

Personnel 
 Sly Stone - co-lead vocals, composer, producer
 Jerry Martini - tenor saxophone
 Cynthia Robinson - trumpet
 Freddie Stone - guitars, co-lead and backing vocals
 Rose Stone - piano, co-lead and backing vocals
 Larry Graham - bass, co-lead and backing vocals
 Greg Errico - drums
 Little Sister (Vet Stone, Mary McCreary, Elva Mouton) - backing vocals

Samples 

This is not an exhaustive list; a more comprehensive list can be found here.

 2Pac ("Peep Game", "Souljah's Revenge", "Temptations", "Young Niggaz")
 Adina Howard ("Freak Like Me")
 Alanis Morissette ("Thank U")
 Arrested Development ("Mr. Wendal", "Revolution")
 Backstreet Boys ("Boys Will Be Boys")
 De La Soul ("Eye Know")
 Digital Underground ("The Humpty Dance", "The Return Of The Crazy One", "Your Life's A Cartoon")
 Dr. Dre ("Deep Cover")
 Gorillaz ("19-2000 (Soulchild Remix)")
 KRS-ONE ("Sound of Da Police")
 Main Source ("Watch Roger Do His Thing")
 MC Zappa ("Hardcore", "Video Dames")
 Pete Rock & C.L. Smooth ("Anger In The Nation", "For Pete's Sake")
 The Pharcyde ("I'm That Type Of Nigga")
 Eazy E ("Eazy-Duz-It")
 Public Enemy ("Can't Do Nuttin' For Ya Man (Dub Mixx)", "Can't Truss It", "Fight The Power", "Frankenstar", "Get The Fuck Outta Dodge", "Hit Da Road Jack", "Tie Goes To The Runner")
 Stetsasonic ("It's In My Song")
 TLC ("Ain't 2 Proud 2 Beg (Left Eye's 3 Minutes And Counting", "What About Your Friends")

1968 songs
1969 singles
Epic Records singles
Sly and the Family Stone songs
Song recordings produced by Sly Stone
Songs written by Sly Stone
Sampled drum breaks